Voice of Montenegro was a weekly newspaper published in Cetinje between 1873 and 1916. After the Serbian annexation of Montenegro in 1918, the newspaper continued to be published in exile until 1922. It was the official gazette of the Principality of Montenegro and later the Kingdom of Montenegro.

The newspaper was the direct successor of the first Montenegrin newspaper, "Montenegrin", which was published from 1871 until 1873.

History

Origins and the first publication
Montenegrin, the first newspaper of Montenegro, began its publication on January 21, 1871 in Cetinje, then capital of the Principality of Montenegro. From its beginnings it was funded by the state of Montenegro. The official owner and first editor-in-chief was Jovan Sundečić, writer and secretary of the Petrović-Njegoš dynasty. During its existence, Montenegrin was also distributed in Austria-Hungary, where it had about 700 subscribers.

Publishing
In January 1873, the Austro-Hungarian authorities banned the distribution of Montenegrin in their territory, linking it to a forbidden nationalist organization, United Serb Youth. In February 1873, Montenegrin stopped being published. In April 1873, the newspaper continued to be published under its new name, Voice of Montenegro, after which it is again distributed to the territories of Austria-Hungary and the Kingdom of Serbia. The first editor-in-chief of the new paper was Simo Popović, writer and politician from Vojvodina (then part of Austria-Hungary). Other notable editors include writer Laza Kostić and politician Lazar Tomanović.

After the January 1916 Montenegrin capitulation in the World War I and later the annexation of Montenegro in 1918, it continued to be periodically published from January 1917 to June 18, 1922, in Paris and Rome, as the official newspaper of the Montenegrin government-in-exile.

References

"Glas Crnogorca", digitalno izdanje svih brojeva

Mass media in Cetinje
Publications established in 1871